Big Daddy may refer to:

Arts and entertainment

Characters 
 Big Daddy (BioShock), a heavily armored adversary in the BioShock video game series
 Big Daddy (Transformers), a character from Transformers
 A character in the Tennessee Williams 1955 play Cat on a Hot Tin Roof
 A comic character in the comic Buster, based on Crabtree
 A character in the syndicated comic strip Raising Duncan by Chris Browne
 A character in The Simpsons, episode "The Simpsons Spin-Off Showcase"
 A character Dad in The Fairly OddParents
 A zombified main character from the movie Land of the Dead
 The name of the former leader of Millennium in Gungrave
 The father of Blanche Devereaux on The Golden Girls
 "Big Daddy" (Golden Girls episode), a related episode of the series
 Vincent Price's cameo role in the 1963 movie Beach Party
 A character from the comic book series Kick-Ass, and its film adaptation
 A character in the Disney movie The Princess and the Frog
 A character in the 2012 film Django Unchained
 Big Daddy was the main villain in the 1998 video game Rogue Trip: Vacation 2012

Films 
 Big Daddy (1969 film), a horror film
 Big Daddy (1999 film), a comedy film starring Adam Sandler

Music 
 Big Daddy (John Mellencamp album), 1989
 Big Daddy (Bukka White album), 1974
 Big Daddy (band), a novelty band who covered 80's & 90's songs in 50's & 60's style
 "Big Daddy" (song), the lead single from Heavy D's sixth album, Waterbed Hev
 "(I Hate You) Big Daddy", a song from Walk Hard: The Dewey Cox Story

Other media
 Big Daddy?, an anti-evolution religious tract by Jack Chick
 Big Daddy 103.9, a former on-air brand of a Greater Sudbury, Ontario, Canada radio station CHNO-FM

People

Arts and entertainment 
 Richard "Big Daddy Ritch" Anderson, lead vocalist for American red dirt metal ensemble Texas Hippie Coalition
 Glenn Hughes (English singer) (born 1951), British bassist and singer
 Big Daddy Kane (born 1968), American rapper
 Big Daddy Kinsey (1927–2001), American Chicago blues singer and musician
 Eric "Big Daddy" Nord (1919–1989), American Beat Generation-era nightclub owner, poet, actor, and hipster
 Ed Roth (1932–2001), American artist, cartoonist, illustrator, pinstriper and custom car designer and builder

Politics 
 Idi Amin (c. 1920–2003), President of Uganda from 1971 to 1979
 Robert Byrd (1917–2010), American senator (self-given epithet in 2006)
 Fred Gardiner (1895–1961), Canadian politician and namesake of the Gardiner Expressway
 Jesse Unruh (1922–1987), American Speaker of the California State Assembly

Sport

Baseball
 Matt Cain (born 1984), American professional baseball player
 Cecil Fielder (born 1963), American former baseball player
 Vladimir Guerrero (born 1975), American professional baseball player
 Matt Holliday (born 1980), American professional baseball player
 Rick Reuschel (born 1949), American former baseball player

Combat sports
 Riddick Bowe (born 1967), American boxer
 Shirley Crabtree (1930–1997), British professional wrestler
 Viscera (wrestler) (Nelson Frazier Jr., 1971–2014), American professional wrestler
 Gary Goodridge (born 1966), Canadian kickboxer and mixed martial artist
 Walter (wrestler) (Walter Hahn; born 1987), Austrian professional wrestler
 Oliver Humperdink (John Jay Sutton; 1949–2011), American professional wrestling manager
 Junkyard Dog (Sylvester Ritter; 1952–1998), American professional wrestler

Other sports
 Zach Banner (born 1993), American football offensive tackle for the Pittsburgh Steelers of the NFL 
 Don Garlits (born 1932), American drag racer
 Eugene Lipscomb (1931–1963), American football defensive lineman (1953–62)
 Shaquille O'Neal (born 1972), American basketball player
 Eric Rupe (born 1963), American BMX racing rider
 Dan Wilkinson (born 1973), American professional football player
 Johan Sundstein (born 1993), better known as BigDaddy N0tail, or just n0tail, Danish Dota 2 player

Other uses 
 Big Daddy (dune), a very large sand dune at Sossusvlei in the Namib Desert, Namibia
 Big Daddy's BBQ Sauce, a food company based in Oklahoma

See also 
 Big Dada, British independent record label imprint
 Big Poppa (disambiguation)
 Daddy (nickname)
 Daddy (disambiguation)

Lists of people by nickname